Faser may refer to:

FASER experiment, a planned particle physics experiment at the Large Hadron Collider at CERN
Henry Minor Faser (1882–1960), American academic administrator, business executive, and political activist